The anime and manga series Zatch Bell!, known in Japan as  for the manga and  for the anime, features an extensive cast created and illustrated by Makoto Raiku. The series takes place in Modern day Japan and follows a genius teenager named Kiyo Takamine and his  Zatch Bell, a human-like being with supernatural powers.

Creation and conception
After Raiku's "Newtown Heroes" series in the Shonen Sunday Super ended, Raiku looked at his old drafts he created in the past for an idea for his next series. One of his ideas was about a mercenary who used a giant sword to defeat enemies. After playing with that idea for three months, Raiku decided to abandon it and go with another idea. His next idea was a story where a middle school student, the prototype of Kiyo, finds an old toy that turns into a giant knight that combats evil. After taking this up with his agent, he was advised to use a cuter character to fight and thus, Zatch was created. After Raiku worked on the idea for a month, it was published. The reason Zatch uses lightning spells is because the "rai" in his name is the Japanese word for "lightning".

Protagonists

Kiyo Takamine and Zatch Bell

Kiyo is a genius 14-year-old junior high school student with an IQ of over 180. His classmates eventually shunned him due to his high intelligence causing him to develop an introverted and apathetic demeanor to the point where he skips school on a regular basis. One day, Zatch, an overly cheerful amnesic boy, is sent by Kiyo's father to live with Kiyo. Zatch's personality slowly influences Kiyo causing him to become more outgoing and friendly and allowing him to befriend many people during the course of the series. Also brought to light is the fact that Zatch's twin brother, Zeno Bell, was the one who erased Zatch's memory in order to make him suffer. In battle, Zatch's spells revolve around lightning. His most powerful spell, Bao, allows him to create a huge electrical dragon.

Kiyo is voiced by Takahiro Sakurai in the Japanese version, and Jason Spisak in the English dub. Zatch is voiced by Ikue Ōtani, and by Konami Yoshida for the final nine episodes in the Japanese version. He is voiced by Debi Derryberry in the English dub.

Parco Folgore and Kanchomé

 and his Mamodo Partner  are friends and allies of Kiyo and Zatch. Chichi wo Moge! was changed to Hey Hey Let's Dance all Day by Viz Media and Muteki Folgore to Iron Man Folgore. Although appearing perverted, cowardly, and weak, Folgore is a person with high morale standards and is more insightful than he seems. In the past, Folgore was a short tempered and vicious man who was feared in town due to his ruthless nature. His parents threatened him with a shotgun to leave home out of fear. Folgore later changed his personality after watching a hippopotamus and oxpecker living in mutualism and developed his comedic personality. Kanchomé's appearance is that of a young boy wearing a blanket sleeper, with large eyes and a duck bill. His personality tends toward childish and abrasive, often crying and whining like an infant. He greatly admires Folgore, believing him to be invincible. Kanchomé's spells involve transformation and illusions. He later gains the ability to create clones with inhuman strength and a spell that can trap his opponents in an illusionary world giving him full control over their senses. Kanchomé's book was burned by an attack by Clear Note. The duo came in 7th place overall.

Folgore is voiced by Hiroki Takahashi in the Japanese version, and Dave Wittenberg in the English dub. Kanchomé is voiced by Masami Kikuchi in the Japanese version, and in the English dub by Richard Steven Horvitz up to episode 48, and Jeff Nimoy for the remainder of the series.

Megumi Oumi and Tia

Both Megumi and Tia have expressed romantic interest in Kiyo and Zatch, respectively. Megumi is a famous Japanese teen idol and pop singer who spends most of her time working. Tia is a young girl who believed no one could be trusted in the Mamodo tournament after being attacked by a friend of hers from the Mamodo World. When Kiyo and Zatch save Megumi and Tia from an attack by the same Mamodo, Tia begins to trust others again and allies with Kiyo and Zatch in order to make sure the Mamodo World would be ruled by a kind king. Tia's spells consist mostly of defensive and regenerative spells which are used to support and heal their allies. Tia's book is burned while protecting her friends from Clear Note's spells. She had a crush on Zatch, despite her hobby of abusing him physically. They came in 5th place in the competition.

Megumi is voiced by Ai Maeda in the Japanese version, and Kate Higgins in the English dub. Tia is voiced by Rie Kugimiya in the Japanese version, and Melissa Fahn in the English dub.

Kafk Sunbeam and Ponygon

, an engineer from Germany working on projects in Japan. Ponygon looks like a small horse but has the personality of a dog, and can only communicate by bleating like a sheep. Because of this, Ponygon is unable to communicate his real name, and is given the name Ponygon by Kiyo. In the Mamodo world, Ponygon hated other Mamodo after watching his father work as a riding animal and isolated himself from others. Zatch eventually befriended Ponygon after they saved Ponygon's father from a poisonous snake bite. Ponygon's spells give him armor, increasing his speed and power with each spell. Eventually Ponygon gains the ability to manipulate fire and the ability to fly. During Clear Note's assault, Sunbeam was forced to burn Ponygon's book in order to stop his body from breaking down. They came in 4th place in the contest.

Kafk Sunbeam's is voiced by Hozumi Gouda in the Japanese version, and Henry Dittman in the English dub. Ponygon's is voiced by Satomi Kōrogi in the Japanese version, and Dave Wittenberg in the English dub.

Sherry Belmont and Brago

Sherry attempted to commit suicide by jumping off a bridge, but was saved and befriended by a poor girl named Koko, her first and best friend. During the events of the Mamodo battle, Koko became brainwashed by her Mamodo partner Zofis and destroyed the town. Sherry then meets her Mamodo,  and teams up with him in order to save Koko. Brago has a rough, antisocial attitude but is kind underneath. Upon saving Koko, Brago threatens Zofis into erasing Koko's memories of the time she spent with Zofis in an act of mercy. Gratified, Sherry promises Brago she will make him the Mamodo King. After helping Kiyo and Zatch defeat Clear Note, Brago is defeated by Zatch in the final battle to determine the King, coming in 2nd place overall. Brago's spells are based on the manipulation of gravity, giving him the ability to increase gravity in a certain area or fire a gravitational well from his hand. Sherry assists in battle with her flail.

Sherry is voiced by Fumiko Orikasa in the Japanese version, and in the English dub by Saffron Henderson up to episode 85, and Karen Strassman afterward. Brago is voiced actor by Kazunari Kojima in the Japanese version, and Wally Wingert in the English dub.

Antagonists

Koko and Zofis

 is Sherry Belmont's first and best friend who saved Sherry's life when she attempted suicide. Koko lives a life of poverty and was accepted to a university through a full scholarship. Shortly thereafter Koko meets her Mamodo partner  who brainwashes her into doing his bidding. Zofis then starts to build his army of Mamodo by freeing the Mamodo from a thousand years ago from stone and brainwashes the descendants of the Mamodo partner. As Kiyo, Zatch, and other Mamodo invade Zofis' hideout, he is confronted by Sherry and Brago and is eventually defeated. Threatened by Brago, Zofis undoes his control on Koko and erases her memories of the Mamodo battles. Once that was done, Sherry has Zofis' book burned. Zofis's spells are based on combustion.

Koko is voiced by Chinami Nishimura in the Japanese version, and Lara Jill Miller in the English dub. Zofis is voiced by Toshiko Fujita in the Japanese version, and Susan Silo in the English dub.

Faudo, Rioh and Banikis Ghigau 

 makes its first appearance as a tower the size of Mount Fuji by the coast of New Zealand. Inside the structure is a giant Mamodo who can only be freed when a large amount of power breaks its seal. It was sent to Earth by the tribe of the Mamodo , and does not follow the rules of the Mamodo Battle, allowing it to use spells without the need of a book nor partner. Faudo can only be controlled by a special jewel which Rioh has possession of. Rioh takes the form of a centaur with a lion-like tail and a mouth-like opening on his abdomen where his partner  hides. To get the required power to release Faudo, Rioh placed a curse on Li-en, Ellie, Nicole, and Aleshie, which saps their strength until either Faudo is released or they die. Upon Faudo's release, Rioh engages Kiyo Takamine and Zatch Bell in battle which ultimately results in Kiyo's death (though he is eventually resuscitated by Momon). Rioh however is later defeated by Zeno Bell who takes the jewel and control of Faudo.

Banikis is voiced by Satoshi Taki, and Rioh is portrayed by Keiko Yamamoto.

Dufort and Zeno Bell

Because of the scientists treatment, Dufort gains an apathetic personality and harbors a deep hatred against humanity. He journeys with Zeno to see things that interest him. Zeno is Zatch Bell's twin brother. Zeno was envious that Zatch was bestowed with the power of Bao and lived away from the castle while he was forced to endure torturous training set up by his father, the Mamodo King. When seeing Zatch's name on the participating Mamodo Battle list, Zeno aims to make Zatch suffer the same way he had. When confronting Zatch inside Faudo, Zeno accidentally reads Zatch's memories of the Mamodo World, which he had stolen prior, and discovers Zatch had also led a life of suffering. After Zatch defeats Zeno, Zeno apologizes to Zatch and gives Zatch the missing piece of Bao. Dufort, after realizing life has meaning, helps Zatch and his friends prepare for the battle against Clear Note. Zeno's spells are based on lightning which is fired from his hands.

Dufort is voiced by Hikaru Midorikawa in the Japanese version, and Dave Wittenberg in the English dub. Zeno is voiced by Urara Takano in the Japanese version, and Debi Derryberry in the English dub.

Vino and Clear Note

 is a young infant brainwashed by his Mamodo . Due to his young age, Vino has an unlimited supply of Heart Energy needed to fuel spells. Clear Note's appearance is that of a young thin man and who aims to become the Mamodo King in order to destroy all Mamodo. He claims he is the end of evolution for Mamodo and has been commanded by nature to wipe out the Mamodo race. Clear Note's spells consist of complete annihilation with his final spell transforming him into a giant monster. After being defeated by Kiyo and Zatch, Clear Note's personality was erased, and he was reborn as a Mamodo named . They came in 3rd place overall. The characters are not featured in the anime.

Other notable characters

Suzy Mizuno
She has a crush on him, and is jealous of other girls that Kiyo spends time around. She is a self-proclaimed klutz and often gets sidetracked from the original task at hand. Suzy freely admits that she has trouble with various academic subjects, particularly mathematics. Her favorite hobby is to draw faces on fruits and other round objects to express her feelings.

Suzy is voiced by Tomoko Akiya in the Japanese version, and Colleen O'Shaughnessey in the English dub.

Naomi
 is Zatch's bully at the playground who aims to make Zatch crunch as much as possible. Her appearance is that of a young girl with pig tails and oversized teeth which are always clenched, a trait her parents also share. In a mini-comic in the manga's last volume, it is revealed that she loves Zatch, who does not share the same feelings.

Naomi is voiced by Shihomi Mizowaki in the Japanese version, and Michelle Ruff in the English dub.

Lori and Kolulu

She comes upon her Mamodo  on the streets and takes her in as a little sister. When Lori reads a spell from Kolulu's book, Kolulu loses her timid and kind personality and gains a merciless and bloodthirsty one; Her body then grows and she gains metallic claws. When a transformed Kolulu engages Kiyo and Zatch in battle, Kolulu accidentally injures Lori and uses her willpower to revert to normal. She explains that personality was instilled in her since she refused to join the Mamodo Battles. She asks Zatch to burn her book and become the King of the Mamodo World and prevent what happened to her from happening ever again, instilling in him the idea to become a "kind king", a goal he has for the rest of the series. Lori later made another appearance giving a pep talk to Zatch before his and Kiyo's duel with Apollo and Rops. Kiyo sees that she is doing well since Kolulu went back to the Mamodo World. Though Kolulu's alternate form's spells revolved around her claws, her true spells are revealed to be based on protection.

Lori is voiced by Yuka Imai in the Japanese version, and Philece Sampler in the English dub. Kolulu's is voiced by Houko Kuwashima in the Japanese version, and Kate Higgins in the English dub.

Apollo and Rops

, is the heir to a successful American business company, and is traveling the world before being instated as the head of the company. He is also the replacement for Djem. He meets his Mamodo  on the way and they begin traveling together and defeating Mamodo when challenged. When traveling to Japan, the pair battle and befriend Kiyo and Zatch before leaving. In Holland, they encounter Dufort and Zeno Bell and are defeated with Rops' book being burned. Kiyo was informed of what happened to Rops during his next encounter with Apollo. After the pair's defeat, Apollo returns home to run the company and uses its resources to assist Kiyo and his friends whenever possible like getting those who were paired with the Ancient Mamodo back to their respectful cities. Rops' spells were based on the manipulation of ropes and chains.

Apollo is voiced by Toshihiko Seki in the Japanese version, and Michael Lindsay in the English dub. Rops is voiced by Mika Kanai in the Japanese version, and Michelle Ruff in the English dub.

Li-en and Wonrei
 
After doing so, Li-akron allows Li-en and Wonrei's relationship to continue after witnessing his feelings. Wonrei's spells are based on martial arts combined with the ability of summoning ethereal forms of a white tiger. Wonrei's book was burned while battling with Faudo's guardians.

Li-en is voiced by Haruna Ikezawa in the Japanese version, and Gwendoline Yeo in the English dub. Wonrei is voiced by Akira Ishida in the Japanese version, and Crispin Freeman in the English dub.

Lupa and Purio

 is a woman with a large afro and a hideous face. Purio is an arrogant, bratty Mamodo in princely clothes who likes to use his regal appearance to show a strong front, despite being extremely weak. Purio later befriends Kanchomé and has his book burned by Clear Note. They came in 8th place overall. Papipurio's spells involve spitting substances such as acid or glue out of his mouth.

Lupa is voiced by Chihiro Sakurai in the Japanese version, and Dorothy Elias-Fahn in the English dub. Purio is voiced by Michiru Yamizaki in the Japanese version, and Sam Riegel in the English dub.

Gustav and Vincent Bari

 is a Finnish man who is the partner of the Mamodo . Bari looks like a ruthless and cold jester who is always scowling. He defeats many Mamodo in the search of a meaning for battle. When combating Kiyo and Zatch, Zatch's goal of being a kind King prompts Bari to aim to be a powerful king. Bari, initially confused on how to achieve this goal, defeats a Mamodo which puts him on the brink of death and leaves him with many permanent scars. When complimented by that Mamodo, Bari understands what it means to be a strong king.

During the battle against Faudo, Bari infiltrates the giant and encounters the Mamodo Keith whom he defeats. Keith however activates a trap and Bari sacrifices himself in order to save Zatch and has his book burnt in the process. Gustav, who is always critical of Bari, praises his Mamodo for being able to knock Zatch, a Mamodo likely to become the King, out of the trap's area. Bari's spells involve forming vortexes on his hands and using them as drills or firing them at enemies.

Gustav is voiced by Unshou Ishizuka in the Japanese version, and Crispin Freeman in the English dub. Vincent Bari is voiced by Ryotaro Okiayu in the Japanese version, and Wally Wingert in the English dub.

Dr. Riddles and Kido

While in his house full of books, the Mamodo , romanized as Kedo by Viz Media in the manga, asks Riddles if he would help him become the Mamodo King. Reminded of his grandson, Riddles decides to help Kido and leaves his isolation. During the course of the Mamodo Battle, Dr. Riddles's high intelligence allowed him to unravel the mystery of the Mamodo Books, information he shared with others whom he deemed good. In addition, Dr. Riddles gained a group of super-powered individuals called the Majestic Twelve as his entourage. He informed Kiyo and his friends about the threat the Mamodo Zofis posed and organized a group of Mamodo to help them defeat him. Kido is a childish boy resembling a ventriloquist dummy wearing a graduation cap who is very gullible, believing any lie told by Riddles, who tells him he was kidding, eliciting shocked reactions from Kido. During the infiltration of Zofis' base, Kido's book is burned whilst defeating Belgim EO. Dr. Riddles continued to help Kiyo afterwards. Kido's spells involve changing his body into weapons and his strongest spells allow him to create a giant mechanical goddess.

Dr. Riddles is voiced by Rokuro Naya in the Japanese version, and Quinton Flynn in the English dub. Kido is voiced by Akemi Okamura in the Japanese version, and Brianne Siddall in the English dub.

Uri and Penny

Uri is a poor man who cooperated with Penny in order to steal food for his family. At the end of the series, Uri has a stable job as a chef. Penny resembles a young girl who has an obsessive love with Zatch, who is fearful of her. When she discovers that Zatch does not remember her after losing his memory, she goes on an angry rampage and tries to defeat him and send him back to the Mamodo World and joins up with Zofis. Zofis gives her a number of brainwashed Mamodo to do her bidding. As the series progresses, Penny realizes the suffering Zofis causes and sacrifices her book in order to help Zatch defeat Zofis' minions. Penny's spells involve the manipulation of water.

Uri is voiced by Kosuke Toriumi in the Japanese version, and Stephen Apostolina in the English dub. Penny is voiced by Naoko Matsui in the Japanese version, and Stephanie Sheh in the English dub.

Alvin and Byonko

Byonko's appearance is that of a humanoid frog with a four-leaf clover on his head, that became three when Alvin plucked a petal off. Byonko joins up with Zofis believing he could make friends with him and the ancient Mamodo. Alvin, knowing Zofis' real evil intentions, hides his dentures making it impossible to cast spells. As the series progresses, Byonko realizes that Zofis is evil and decides to help Kiyo and friends defeat Zofis' minions; prompting Alvin to use his dentures and unleash their surprisingly powerful spells. His book catches fire along with Penny's in the process, but he befriends Zatch Bell and his friends before returning to the Mamodo World.

Alvin is voiced by Masaaki Tsukada in the Japanese version, and David Lodge in the English dub. Byonko is voiced by Yasuhiro Takato in the Japanese version, and Brian Beacock in the English dub.

Albert and Laila

Laila was among the Ancient Mamodo that was one of the victims of Goren of the Stone. Knowing Zofis' intentions, Laila planned to defy him from the start. When she meets Kiyo and Zatch, she helps them escape from Zofis' minions. However, Zofis finds out and tells her that if the Moon Stone used to free them from stone is destroyed, they will revert to stone tablets. With Kiyo's persuasion, Laila realizes that Zofis is bluffing and helps him destroy the Moon Stone. With the stone gone, Albert is released from the mind control and works together with Laila to defeat Zofis' minions. After the fall of Zofis, Laila has Kiyo burn her book, explaining that the battle to determine the Mamodo King ended a thousand years ago for her. Laila's spells are themed around crescent moons.

Albert is voiced by Kishou Taniyama in the Japanese version, and Crispin Freeman in the English dub. Laila is voiced by Rumi Shishido in the Japanese version, and Kate Higgins in the English dub.

Jido and Ted

Ted's appearance is of a young boy with a long pompadour hairstyle. When passing by Zatch Bell's hometown, Zatch offers Ted lodging at Kiyo's home where both pairs become friends. During the battle against Faudo, Jido and Ted infiltrate Faudo where he is forced to fight against Cherish, who is being controlled by Zeno Bell. Ted manages to free Cherish from Zeno's control, but his book is burnt in the process. Ted's spells are physical upgrades, and can only be cast in a particular order.

Jido is voiced by Kouji Ishii in the Japanese version, and Christopher Darga in the English dub. Ted is voiced by Junko Takeuchi in the Japanese version, and Michael P. Greco in the English dub.

Ellie and Arth

 is a young girl who was confined to a hospital bed waiting for death from her terminal illness. She then meets her Mamodo  who tells her she must continue to live, prompting the creation of her tomboyish personality. Arth is a wise Mamodo who wishes to become the Mamodo King to change the laws of the Mamodo World for the greater good. Ellie and Arth were the first ones who were aware of the existence of Faudo and attempted to stop its resurrection. However, the Mamodo Rioh placed a curse on Ellie forcing Arth to assist in breaking the seal to Faudo. After breaking the seal, Ellie and Arth ally themselves with Kiyo to send Faudo back to the Mamodo World. After the victory over Faudo, Ellie returns to the hospital where a cure has been found for her illness. During her stay, she and Arth are engaged by Clear Note's minion Gorm and Arth is sent to the Mamodo World in their defeat. The duo were in 10th place. Arth's spells were based on sword techniques.

Ellie is voiced by Konami Yoshida in the Japanese version, and Sandy Fox in the English dub. Arth is voiced by Hideyuki Umezu in the Japanese version, and Randall Montgomery in the English dub.

Berun and Keith

 is a man who wears a red ball on his nose. He met his Mamodo  in a potato tempura restaurant. Keith claims to be Bari's rival, though Bari does not acknowledge this. Keith joined up with Rioh in order to usurp him of Faudo's power. Keith constantly smokes cigars and often makes his entrances singing a gibberish version of Ode to Joy. Keith carries a walking stick that doubles as a baton, which he tends to wave about randomly while he sings. Keith's book was burned when he was defeated by Bari inside Faudo. His spells are based on lasers.

Berun is voiced by Satoshi Taki, and Keith is portrayed by Kenyu Horiuchi.

Aleshie and Riya

 is a teenager from an African village who was forced to join the resurrection of Faudo by Rioh. He, along with his Mamodo partner  were escorted by Rioh to Faudo where they remained until running into Kiyo and Zatch and decided it was the right time to betray Rioh. After the resurrection of Faudo, Aleshie joins Kiyo's group to return Faudo back to the Mamodo world. Riya's book is burned when battling Rioh's minion, Zaruchim. Riya's spells cause him to transform his body parts to use for battle.

Aleshie is voiced by Tomokazu Seki, and Riya is by Kotono Mitsuishi.

Souza and Kardio

 is a young child and partner to the Mamodo . He has a brash personality and hates working with others, after having been ambushed by Mamodo who have formed an alliance. He is able to understand Kardio, who, like Ponygon, is unable to speak words. The pair eventually partnered up with Ellie and Arth in order to prevent Faudo's resurrection. Kardio is sent back to the Mamodo world after sacrificing himself to defeat Faudo's Heart Guardian and protecting Ellie. Kardio has an obvious dislike for Ponygon. His spells allow him to gain armor and manipulate ice, akin to Ponygon's fire.

Souza is voiced by Kumiko Watanabe, and Kardio is by Yuji Ueda.

Nicole and Cherish

 is a young woman who works as a game warden. She disguised as a male in her travels with her Mamodo  for safety purposes. Cherish was the caregiver of a group of orphan Mamodo in the Mamodo World. During the Mamodo battles, Nicole is put under Rioh's curse and forced to help resurrect Faudo. After gaining control of the massive Mamodo, Zeno Bell places an electrical torture device on Cherish and forces her to do his bidding. Cherish is eventually forced to battle her longtime friend, Ted, who sacrifices his book to free her. Cherish, freed from Zeno's control, assists Kiyo and Zatch in defeating Zeno. Her book is burned in the battle against Zeno. Her abilities are based on crystals.

Nicole is voiced by Sayaka Aida, and Cherish is by Ai Nagano.

Elle Chivas and Momon

 is a nun who journeys with her perverted Mamodo  in order to stop the Mamodo battle. Elle has a hard time controlling Momon, who often steals women's undergarments.  She eventually allies with Kiyo and their friends, and begins a relationship with Kafk Sunbeam and is seen living with him in Africa at the end of the series. Momon's appearance is a young boy with a monkey-like face and pink rabbit ears. His ears allow him to sense Mamodo energy and allows him to detect Mamodo and their spells. Momon is a coward and avoids battle at all costs. Whenever he lies, his face droops down onto the floor. Kiyo is able to force him to reveal Faudo's location, and he is forced by Elle to accompany the group to stop the Mamodo's resurrection. During their confrontation with Zeno Bell, Momon, inspired by Kiyo's sacrifices inside Faudo, is able to sum up enough courage to help stall Zeno until Kiyo's arrival; his book is burned in the process. Although his spells are themed around trickery and evasion, none of them could be used to hurt people, something that made the non-violent Elle proud of him.

Elle is voiced by Kotono Mitsuishi, and Momon is by Naozumi Takahashi.

Rin Visé and Ashron

 is largely silent, and little is known about him, though he is known for his very distinctive hairdo. His Mamodo partner,  is a giant dragon with red scales, able to change his body into a human form. Ashron aims to become the Mamodo King to bring an end to discrimination in the Mamodo World. Vise and Ashron were combating Clear Note since the beginning of the Mamodo Battles. They later ally and inform Kiyo and Zatch about Clear's existence and work together to defeat him. Ashron's book is burned in the battle but he is able to gravely injure Clear Note before returning to the Mamodo World. Ashron's spells allow him to unleash massive blasts of fire and change parts of his body to attack. Ashron's Dragon Scales allow him to take many attacks while receiving little damage. Ashron was 9th place in the Mamodo fight. They do not appear in the anime.

References

Zatch Bell!